Naaman is a commander of the armies of Ben-Hadad II in the time of Joram, king of Israel. He is mentioned in 2 Kings 5.

Naaman or Naamans may also refer to:

Places
Naaman, Delaware, an unincorporated community in New Castle County, Delaware, United States
Naamans Creek (spelled Naaman Creek on federal maps), tributary of the Delaware River
Naamans Gardens, Delaware, an unincorporated community in New Castle County, Delaware, United States
Naamans Manor, Delaware, an unincorporated community in New Castle County, Delaware, United States
Naaman Forest High School, public secondary school located in Garland, Texas (USA)
Belus River, a river in Israel earlier known as Na'amân River

People

Mononym 
Naaman (biblical figure), one of the sons of Benjamin
Naâman (born 1990), French reggae artist

Given name 
Naaman Roosevelt (born 1987), American football wide receiver

Surname 
Issam Naaman (born 1937), Lebanese lawyer and politician
Nicolas Naaman (1911–1982), Catholic archbishop

See also
Naiman (disambiguation)
Naman (disambiguation)
Nu'man